Harbourfront Centre is a key cultural organization on the waterfront of Toronto, Ontario, Canada, situated at 235 Queens Quay West. Established as a crown corporation in 1972  by the Government of Canada to create a waterfront park, it became a non-profit organization in 1991. Funding comes from corporate sponsors, government grants, individual donors and entrepreneurial activities. Harbourfront Centre has a seating capacity of 2,000.

Harbourfront Centre works with over 450 community organizations, and hosts more than 4,000 events a year in many disciplines such as theatre, dance, literature, music, film, visual arts and craft. The development is governed by a 26-person community based volunteer Board of Directors, and is assisted by approximately 2,000 volunteers who generously contribute their efforts and time. Harbourfront Centre is patrolled by its own in-house security team, which works closely with police to ensure that the property is protected.

History

The Government of Canada faced mounting criticism from the City of Toronto government due to the amount of money being spent for Montreal on both Expo 67 and the 1976 Summer Olympics. Hence, the Government of Canada decided that it would build Harbourfront Centre and the Government of Ontario would build nearby Ontario Place in order to revitalize Toronto's industrial harbour and increase tourism to the city. As a result, the Government of Canada committed to buying 100 hectares of land to be appropriated for public use.

In 1972 "Harbourfront Corporation" was established as a federal Crown Corporation. In 1975, the top portion of the CN Tower was housed at Harbourfront Centre, and schoolchildren were asked to sign it before it was installed. In the following decades, the area saw a number of uses, hosting children's summer day camps in 1978, and hosting the Cirque du Soleil which performed in the area in 1985. The first WOMAD festival in Canada was held at Harbourfront Centre in 1988.

Harbourfront Centre was formed on January 1, 1991, as a non-profit charitable organization with a mandate to organize and present public events and to operate a  site encompassing York Quay and John Quay (south of Queens Quay West).

In 1982, Queen's Quay Terminal was remodelled by Zeidler Partnership Architects (the same firm that designed the Toronto Eaton Centre). The project transformed the industrial space into a mixed-use building that included shops, restaurants, offices, and exclusive residential condos (it once was the home for Premier Mike Harris).

Since its inception, Harbourfront Centre has been introducing Toronto audiences to artists and art forms that would not normally be seen in commercial venues. Artists who have performed at Harbourfront Centre: Celine Dion, Oscar Peterson, Robert Lepage, STOMP, Julio Iglesias, Spalding Gray, Philip Glass, Ann Murray, k.d. lang, Jim Carrey, Feist, Lillian Allen, and Gordon Lightfoot.

In 2001, Harbourfront Centre organized "World Leaders: A Festival of Creative Genius," to pay homage to 14 renowned global cultural leaders. The participating artists included Issey Miyake, Guy Laliberté, Philippe Starck, Frank Gehry, Lily Tomlin, Stephen Sondheim, Bernardo Bertolucci, Robert Rauschenberg, Harold Pinter, Joni Mitchell, Robert Lepage, Peter Gabriel, Quincy Jones, and Pina Bausch. Each artist had a dedicated night where they received an award and delivered a talk. In 2004, Harbourfront Centre has hosted the Planet IndigenUS Festival, a multi-day celebration and global exploration of contemporary Indigenous civilizations.

Programming
Harbourfront Centre runs year-round programming with a combination of indoor and outdoor events. In the winter months more emphasis is put on theatre shows.

Cultural programming
Main events:

Educational programming
Main events:

Venues

Harbourfront Centre Theatre (formerly known as the Enwave Theatre) — 420-seat theatre
Fleck Dance Theatre
The Power Plant Contemporary Art Gallery
Visual Arts galleries; exhibition space
Harbourfront Stage — outdoor concert venue (formerly Westjet Stage)
Natrel Rink — outdoor skating rink
Lakeview Market
World Café
Toronto Music Garden — designed by Yo Yo Ma and Julie Moir Messervy
Studio Theatre
Brigantine Room
Marilyn Brewer Community Space
Lakeside Terrace
Miss Lou's Room
Craft & Design — studio for artists creating ceramic, glass, metal and textiles
Harbourfront Centre Shop

See also
Amsterdam Bridge
Toronto Maritime Museum
Toronto waterfront
Harbourfront - the neighbourhood surrounding Harbourfront Centre
Toronto Harbour

References

External links

 Harbourfront Centre

Music venues in Toronto
Theatres in Toronto
Art museums and galleries in Ontario
Non-profit organizations based in Toronto
Harbourfront, Toronto
Arts organizations based in Canada
Music venues completed in 1991
Organizations established in 1991
1991 establishments in Ontario
Festival venues in Canada